These are the Canadian number-one country albums of 1999, per the RPM Country Albums chart.

1999
Canada Country Albums
1999 in Canadian music